Robert Joseph "Bob" Doris (born 11 May 1973) is a Scottish National Party (SNP) politician. He has served as the Member of the Scottish Parliament (MSP) for Glasgow Maryhill and Springburn since the 2016 Scottish Parliament election, having previously served as an MSP for  Glasgow from 2007 to 2016.

Life and career
Doris was born in the Vale of Leven, Dunbartonshire, and educated at the University of Glasgow earning an MA in Social Sciences. 

At the 2007 election Doris contested the Glasgow Maryhill Scottish Parliament constituency, finishing second to Patricia Ferguson, majority 2,300.

Prior to the election Doris had acted as campaign manager to Bill Wilson when Wilson challenged John Swinney for the SNP leadership in 2003. Doris convened the SNP Maryhill Constituency Branch and Glasgow Regional Association SNP (GRA) for a number of years. Before the 2007 Scottish Parliamentary elections Doris was set to be council candidate for the Maryhill/Kelvin ward at the Glasgow City Council elections of 2007. He resigned his nomination for the Council seat to avoid the possibility of being elected on a dual mandate.

Since his election, Doris campaigned successfully on a number of issues including free school meals, kinship care payments and Town Centre Regeneration Fund money for Glasgow. He was a leading campaigner against Glasgow City Council's closure of 20 primary and nursery schools, and supported the parental occupation of Wyndford Primary School and St Gregory's Primary School, both in Maryhill. Doris convenes the Scottish Parliament's cross party group on Racial Equality in Scotland and the cross-party group on Rare, Genetic And Undiagnosed Conditions.

In 2011, Doris was the SNP candidate for the redrawn seat of Glasgow Maryhill and Springburn. He was also placed 3rd on the SNP regional list for Glasgow behind Nicola Sturgeon and Humza Yousaf. He was unsuccessful in gaining Glasgow Maryhill and Springburn, losing to Labour's Patricia Ferguson, but was returned as one of two Glasgow list SNP MSPs alongside Yousaf.

2016 – current 
In the 2016 election, he defeated Ferguson and was elected as the constituency member for Glasgow Maryhill and Springburn.

He is currently the convenor of the Social Security Committee in the Scottish Parliament.

See also
Government of the 3rd Scottish Parliament

References

External links 
 
 Personal website, www.bob-doris.scot

1973 births
Living people
Scottish people of Irish descent
Scottish National Party MSPs
Members of the Scottish Parliament for Glasgow constituencies
Members of the Scottish Parliament 2007–2011
Members of the Scottish Parliament 2011–2016
Members of the Scottish Parliament 2016–2021
Members of the Scottish Parliament 2021–2026
People from West Dunbartonshire
Maryhill
Springburn